Radio Sharda is an Indian FM owned by Pir Panchal headquartered at Jammu, Jammu and Kashmir, India.

See also
AIR Srinagar

References 

Radio stations in Jammu and Kashmir
Kashmiri-language mass media
2011 establishments in Jammu and Kashmir
Radio stations established in 2011